Tunesmith Retrofit is an album by American blues/folk singer and guitarist Kelly Joe Phelps, released in 2006. It was his first recording on the Rounder label after five releases with Rykodisc. It reached #5 on the Billboard Top Blues Albums charts.

Reception

Music critic Thom Jurek praised the release in his Allmusic review, calling it "... another side of Phelps to be sure, as a songwriter who understands the actual music of poetry and creates a loose, coarse weave that allows the listener room to inhabit and live inside his songs. His rhythm is true, his words are impure, his songs are nearly glorious. Once more, Phelps shatters expectations and conjures something truly original and brave in the process."

Russell Hall of No Depression wrote "Few songwriters wear the mantle of troubadour as unassumingly as Kelly Joe Phelps. Eschewing the cloying introspection that tends to prevail among the coffeehouse crowd, Phelps writes snapshot vignettes borne from short-story traditions and delivers them in sturdy acoustic settings drawn from folk, free jazz, and country blues. Tunesmith Retrofit is leaner and more spartan than 2003’s Slingshot Professionals, putting the light squarely on his songwriting."

Track listing
All songs written by Kelly Joe Phelps.
"Crow's Nest" – 4:51
"The Anvil" – 3:35
"Spanish Hands" – 4:10
"Plumb Line" – 3:01
"Scapegoat" – 1:39
"Big Shakey" – 4:49
"Tight to the Jar" – 5:43
"MacDougal" – 3:20
"Loud as Ears" – 4:01
"Red Light Nickel" – 3:59
"Handful of Arrows" – 3:31
"Tunesmith Retrofit" – 2:10

Personnel
Kelly Joe Phelps - vocals, guitar, banjo, melodica
Steve Dawson - tremolo Weissenborn, pedal steel guitar
Chris Gestrin - pump organ, Wurlitzer, piano, melodica (6) 
Keith Lowe - acoustic bass
John Raham - drums
Jesse Zubot - fiddle
Production notes:
Produced by Kelly Joe Phelps and Steve Dawson
Engineered & Mixed by Steve Dawson and Sheldon Zaharko
Mastered by Steve Fallone
Photography by Anthony Saint James

References

External links
Discography at Kelly Joe Phelps official web site.

2005 albums
Kelly Joe Phelps albums
Rounder Records albums